Climax is a studio album by visual kei rock group La'Mule. The album was released through Soleil records on February 22, 2001. Two songs from the album, Knife and Sweet Enemy, were released as singles.

Track listing

References

Japanese-language albums
La'Mule albums
2001 albums